Nay Min (born 6 August 1983) is a Burmese actor. He is best known for his leading roles in several Burmese films. Throughout his career, he has acted as leading actor in over 200 films.

Early life and education
Nay Min was born on 6 August 1983 in Thet Ka La Village, Bago, Bago Region, Myanmar. He attended at Thet Ka La high school.

Career
Nay Min went to work in Korea from the age of 19 until he started acting career. He intended to go to school in England but ended up in Korea. After returning from Korea, he entered the art world and made a number of films with his Shwe Sin Oo Film Production and others.

Filmography

Film (Cinema)
Thwar Lu Soe Dar Myo Taw Tat Tal (2012)
Chit San Eain 2028 (2015)
Mingalar Hlae (2015)
Oak Kyar Myet Pauk (2016)
Luu Yadanar Treasure (2016)
Yan Thu (2018)
Lay Par Kyawt Shein Warazain (2019)

References

External links

Living people
1983 births
Burmese male film actors
21st-century Burmese male actors
People from Bago Region